Giyug is an extinct and unattested Australian Aboriginal language. It may (or may not) have been close to Wagaydy—perhaps a dialect—but is otherwise unknown.

References

Daly languages
Unattested languages of Australia